The following is a list of hybrid entities from the folklore record grouped morphologically. Hybrids not found in classical mythology but developed in the context of modern popular culture are listed in a separate section. For actual hybridization in zoology, see Hybrid (biology).

Mythological

Head of one animal, body of another

Mammalian bipeds

 Anubis – The jackal-headed Egyptian God.
 Bastet – The cat-headed Egyptian Goddess.
 Cynocephalus – A dog-headed creature.
 Daksha – His head was replaced by a goat's head after a beheading.
 Ganesha – An elephant-headed God.
 Hayagriva – A horse-headed avatar.
 Horse-Face – A horse-headed guardian or type of guardian of the Underworld in Chinese mythology.
 Ipotane – A race of half-horse half-humans, usually depicted as the reverse of centaurs.
 Keibu Keioiba (alias Kabui Keioiba) – A Meitei folkloric mythical creature having the head of a tiger and the remaining body of a human. 
 Khnum – The ram-headed Egyptian God.
 Maahes, Pakhet, Sekhmet, and Tefnut – Each of these Egyptian Gods has the head of a lion.
 Minotaur – A creature that has the body of a human with the head, tail, and occasional hindquarters of a bull.
 Nandi – Some Puranas describe Nandi or Nandikeshvara as bull-faced, with a human body that resembles that of Shiva in proportion and aspect.
 Narasimha – A Hindu deity with a lion-like face.
 Ox-Head – An ox-headed guardian or type of guardian of the Underworld in Chinese mythology.
 Penghou – A Chinese tree spirit with the face of a human and the body of a dog.
 Pratyangira – A Hindu Goddess having the head of a lion. 
 Sekmet – The lioness-headed Egyptian Goddess.
 Set – The dog-headed Egyptian God.
 Tikbalang - A tall Filipino horse-headed man.
 Varaha – A boar-headed avatar.
 Zhu Bajie – A pig-headed major character of the novel Journey to the West.

Other bipeds

 Alkonost – A creature from Russian folklore with the head of a woman with the body of a bird, said to make beautiful sounds that make anyone who hears them forget all that they know and not want anything more ever again.  
 Bird goddess – Vinca figures of a woman with a bird head.
 Cuca - A creature from Brazilian folklore and female counterpart of the Coco that is depicted as a witch with the head of an alligator. It will catch and eat children that disobey their parents.
 Gamayun – A Russian creature portrayed with the head of a woman and the body of a bird.
 Heqet – The frog-headed Egyptian God.
 Horus, Monthu, Ra, and Seker – Each of these Egyptian Gods has the head of a falcon or hawk.
 Inmyeonjo – A human face with bird body creature in ancient Korean mythology.
 Karura – A divine creature of Japanese Hindu-Buddhist mythology with the head of a bird and the torso of a human.
 Kuk – Kuk's male form has a frog head while his female form has a snake head.
 Meretseger – The cobra-headed Egyptian Goddess.
 Sirin – Half-bird, half-human creature with the head and chest of a woman from Russian folklore; its bird half is generally that of an owl's body.
 Sobek – The crocodile-headed Egyptian God.
 Thoth – The ibis-headed Egyptian God.

Quadrupeds

 Allocamelus – A Heraldic creature that has the head of a donkey and the body of a camel.
 Bai Ze – A creature from Chinese mythology with the head of a human and the body of a cow with six horns and nine eyes.
 Catoblepas - One version of the creature in Gustave Flaubert's The Temptation of Saint Anthony depicts it with the head of a pig and the body of a black African buffalo.
 Criosphinx – A Sphinx that has the head of a ram.
 Gajasimha – A creature with the head of an elephant and the body of a lion.
 Gye-lyong – A creature with the head of a chicken and the body of a dragon.
 Hieracosphinx – A type of Sphinx that had a hawk head.
 Jinmenken - A Japanese creature with the face of a human and the body of a dog.
 Shug Monkey – A creature that is part-monkey and part-dog.

Other

 Atargatis – Human face, fish body.
 Draconcopedes (snake-feet) – "Snake-feet are large and powerful serpents, with faces very like those of human maidens and necks ending in serpent bodies" as described by Vincent of Beauvais.
 Gajamina – A creature with the head of an elephant and body of a fish.
 Merlion – A creature with the head of a lion and the body of a fish.
 Nure-onna – A creature with the head of a woman and the body of a snake.
 Tam Đầu Cửu Vĩ or Ông Lốt - is a divine beast with 3 human heads and a 9-tailed snake body, the mount of the god Ông Hoàng Bơ in Đạo Mẫu and Vietnamese folk religion.
 Ushi-oni – A Yōkai with the head of a bull and the body of a spider.
 Zhuyin – A creature with the face of a man and the body of a snake.

Front of one animal, rear of another
 Capricorn – A creature that is half-goat half-fish. It is identified with the constellation Capricornus.
 Echidna – A half-woman and half-snake monster that lives inside a cave.
 Fu Xi – A god said to have been made by Nu Wa.
 Glaistig – A Scottish fairy or ghost who can take the form of a goat-human hybrid.
 Griffin – A creature with the front quarters of an eagle and the hind quarters of a lion.
 Harpy – A half-bird, half-woman creature of Greek mythology, portrayed sometimes as a woman with bird wings and legs.
 Hippalectryon – A creature with the front half of a horse and the rear half has a rooster's wings, tail, and legs.
 Hippocampus (or Hippocamp) – A Greek mythological creature that is half-horse half-fish.
 Hippogriff – A creature with the front quarters of an eagle and hind quarters of a horse.
 Jengu – A water spirit with the tail of a fish.
 Ketu – An Asura who has the lower parts of a snake and said to have four arms.
 Lamia – A female with the lower body like that of a snake and is also spelled as Lamaia. This should not be confused with the Greco-Roman Lamia.
 Matsya – An avatar of Lord Vishnu that is half-man half-fish.
 Merfolk – A race of half-human, half-fish creatures. The males are called Mermen and the females are called Mermaids.
 Auvekoejak – A merman from Inuit folklore of Greenland and northern Canada that has fur on its fish tail instead of scales.
 Ceasg – A Scottish mermaid.
 Sirena – A mermaid from Philippine folklore.
 Siyokoy – Mermen with scaled bodies from Philippine folklore. It is the male counterpart of the Sirena.
 Nü Wa – A woman with the lower body of a serpent in Chinese folklore.
 Nāga – A term referring to human/snake mixes of all kinds.
 Onocentaur – A creature that has the upper body of a human with the lower body of a donkey and is often portrayed with only two legs.
 Ophiotaurus – A creature that has the upper body of a bull and the lower body of a snake.
 Peryton – A deer with the wings of a bird.
 Sea-lion - A creature with the head and upper body of a lion and the tail of a fish.
 Siren – Half-bird, half-woman creature of Greek mythology, who lured sailors to their deaths with their singing voices.
 Skvader – A Swedish creature with the forequarters and hind-legs of a hare and the back, wings and tail of a female wood grouse.
 Tatzelwurm – A creature with the face of a cat and a serpentine body. 
 Tlanchana – An aquatic deity that is part woman and part snake.
 Triton - A Greek God and the son of Poseidon who has the same description as the Merman. Some depictions have him with two fish tails.

Front of one animal as head of another

 Anggitay – A strictly-female creature that has the upper body of a human with the lower body of a horse.
 Centaur – A creature that has the upper body of a human with the lower body of a horse.
 Khepri – The dung beetle-headed Egyptian God.
 Kinnara – Half-human, half-bird in later Indian mythology.
 Kurma – Upper-half human, lower-half tortoise.
 Ichthyocentaurs – Creatures that have the torsos of a man or woman, the front legs of a horse, and the tails of a fish.
 Scorpion man – Half-man half-scorpion.
 Serpopard – A creature that is part-snake and part-African leopard.

Animals with extra parts

 Angel – Humanoid creatures who are generally depicted with bird-like wings. In Abrahamic mythology and Zoroastrianism mythology, angels are often depicted as benevolent celestial beings who act as messengers between God and humans.
 Bat – An Egyptian goddess with the horns and ears of a cow.
 Cernunnos – An ancient Gaulish/Celtic God with the antlers of a deer.
 Fairy – A humanoid with insect-like wings.
 Hathor – An Egyptian goddess with cow horns.
 Horned God – A god with horns.
 Jackalope – A jackrabbit with the horns of a whitetail deer.
 Satyr – Originally an ancient Greek nature spirit with the body of a man, but the long tail and pointed ears of a horse. From the beginning, satyrs were inextricably associated with drunkenness and ribaldry, known for their love of wine, music, and women. By the Hellenistic Period, satyrs gradually began to be depicted as unattractive men with the horns and legs of goats, likely due to conflation with Pan. They were eventually conflated with the Roman fauns and, since roughly the second century AD, they have been indistinguishable from each other.
 Silenos - A tutor to Dionysus who is virtually identical to satyrs and normally indistinguishable, although sometimes depicted as more elderly.
 Seraph – An elite angel with multiple wings.
 Winged cat – A cat with the wings of a bird.
 Winged genie – A humanoid with bird wings.
 Winged horse – A horse with the wings of a bird. *Pegasus is the name of the winged horse, not the species
 Winged lion – A lion with the wings of a bird.

Body of one animal with legs and extra features of another

 Adlet – A human with dog legs.
 Bes – An Egyptian god with the hindquarters of a lion.
 Lilitu – A woman with bird legs (and sometimes wings) found in Mesopotamian mythology.
 Faun – An ancient Roman nature spirit with the body of a man, but the legs and horns of a goat. Originally they differed from the Greek satyrs because they were less frequently associated with drunkenness and ribaldry and were instead seen as "shy, woodland creatures". Starting in the first century BC, the Romans frequently conflated them with satyrs and, after the second century AD, the two are virtually indistinguishable.
 Goat people are a class of mythological beings who physically resemble humans from the waist up, and had goat-like features usually including the hind legs of goats. They fall into various categories, such as sprites, gods, demons, and demigods.
 Krampus — A Germanic mythical figure of obscure origin. It is often depicted with the legs and horns of a goat, the body of a man, and animalistic facial features.
 Kusarikku – A demon with the head, arms, and torso of a human and the ears, horns, and hindquarters of a bull.
 Lamia – Woman with duck feet.
 Pan – The god of the wild and protector of shepherds, who has the body of a man, but the legs and horns of a goat. He is often heard playing a flute.

Other hybrids of two kinds

 Alebrije – A brightly colored creature from Mexican mythology.
 Anansi - A West African god, also known as Ananse, Kwaku Ananse, and Anancy. In the Americas he is known as Nancy, Aunt Nancy and Sis' Nancy. Anansi is considered to be the spirit of all knowledge of stories. He is also one of the most important characters of West African and Caribbean folklore. Anansi is depicted in many different ways: sometimes he looks like an ordinary spider, sometimes he is a spider wearing clothes or with a human face, and sometimes he looks much more like a human with spider elements, such as eight legs.
 Avatea – A Mangaian god that has the right half of a man and the left half of a fish.
 Cerberus – A Greek mythological dog that guarded the gates of the underworld, almost always portrayed with three heads and occasionally having a mane of serpents, as well as the front half of one for a tail.
 Drakaina – A female species from Greek mythology that is draconic in nature, primarily depicted as a woman with dragon features.
 Feathered serpent - A Mesoamerican spirit deity that possessed a snake-like body and feathered wings.
 Garuda – A creature that has the head, wings, and legs of an eagle and body of a man.
 Gorgon – Each of them has snakes in place of their hair; sometimes also depicted with a snake-like lower body.
 Jorōgumo - Type of Japanese yōkai, depicted as a spider woman manipulating small fire-breathing spiders.
 Mothman – A humanoid moth.
 Selkie – A seal that becomes a human by shedding its skin on land.
 Karasu-tengu – A crow-type Tengu.
 Uchek Langmeidong - A half-woman and half-hornbill creature in Manipuri folklore, depicted as a girl who was turned into a bird to escape from her stepmother's torture in the absence of her father.
 Werecat – A creature that is part cat, part human, or switches between the two.
 Werehyena - A creature that is part hyena, part human, or switches between the two.
 Werewolf – A creature that becomes a wolf/human-like beast during the nights of the full moon, but is human otherwise.
 Wyvern – A creature with a dragon's head and wings, a reptilian body, two legs, and a tail often ending in a diamond- or arrow-shaped tip.

Hybrids of three kinds

 Ammit – An Egyptian creature with the head of a crocodile, the front legs of a lion, and the back legs and hindquarters of a hippopotamus.
 Chalkydri – Creatures with twelve angel wings, the body of a lion, and the head of a crocodile mentioned in 2 Enoch 
 Chimera – A Greek mythological creature with the head and front legs of a lion, the head and back legs of a goat, and the head of a snake for a tail. Said to be able to breathe fire from lion's mouth.
 Hundun - A Creature with the body of a pig, the legs of a lion or bear and four wings of a bird, with no head.
 Kappa - A Japanese humanoid creature with the legs of a frog and the head and shell of a turtle.
 Sharabha – A Hindu mythological creature having the head of a lion, the legs of deer, and the wings of bird.
 Buraq – A creature from Arabic iconography that has the head of a man and the body of a winged horse.
 Longma – A winged horse with the scales of a dragon.
 Baphomet – Traditionally depicted as an anthropomorphic creature with goat's head
 Chi You – A creature from Chinese mythology with the head of a bull, the torso of a human, and the ears and hindquarters of a bear.
 Cockatrice – A mix between a chicken, a bat, and reptile.
 Sphinx – A creature with the head of a human or a cat, the body of a lion, and occasional wings of an eagle.
 Pamola - A creature from Abenaki mythology with a human body, the head of a moose, with the wings and feet of an eagle that protects Maine's tallest mountain.
 Hatuibwari – A dragon-like creature with the head of a human with four eyes, the body of a serpent, and the wings of a bat.
 Capelobo - A creature from Brazilian folklore with the head of an anteater, the torso of a human, and the legs of a goat.
 Lamassu – A deity that is often depicted with a human head, a bull's body or lion's body, and an eagle's wings.
 Manticore - A creature with the face of a human, the body of a lion, and the tail of a scorpion.

Hybrids of four kinds

 Abraxas – A god-like Gnostic creature with many different types of portrayals, many of which as different types of hybrids.
 Enfield – A Heraldic creature with the head of a fox, the forelegs and sometimes wings of an eagle, the body of a lion, and the tail of a wolf.
 Hatsadiling – A mythical creature with the head and body of a lion, trunk and tusks of an elephant, the comb of a rooster, and the wings of a bird.
 Kamadhenu – A  creature with the head of a human, the body of a cow, the wings of a pigeon, and the tail of a peacock.
 Monoceros – A creature with the head of a deer, the body of a horse, the feet of an elephant, and the tail of a pig.
 Nue – A Japanese Chimera with the head of a monkey, the legs of a tiger, the body of a Japanese raccoon dog, and the front half of a snake for a tail.
 Qilin – A Chinese creature with the head and scales of a dragon, the antlers of a deer, the hooves of an ox, and the tail of a lion. The Japanese version is described as a deer-shaped dragon with the tail of an ox.
 Questing Beast – A creature with the head and tail of a serpent, the feet of a deer, the body of a leopard, and the haunches of a lion.
 Simurgh – A griffin-like creature of Persian mythology with the head of a dog, the body of a lion, the tail of a peacock, and the wings of a hawk.
 Taweret – The hippopotamus-headed Egyptian Goddess.
 Wolpertinger – A creature with the head of a rabbit, the body of a squirrel, the antlers of a deer, and the legs and wings of a pheasant.
 Yali – A Hindu creature with the head of a lion, the tusks of an elephant, the body of a cat, and the tail of a serpent.
 Ypotryll – A Heraldic creature with the tusked head of a boar, the humped body of a camel, the legs and hooves of an ox or goat, and the tail of a snake.

Hybrids of more than four kinds

 Baku – A Japanese creature with the head of an elephant, the ears of a rhinoceros, the legs of a tiger, the body of a bear, and the tail of a cow.
 Calygreyhound – A mythical creature described as having the head of a wildcat, the torso of a deer or antelope, the claws of an eagle as its forefeet, ox hooves, antlers or horns on its head, the hind legs of a lion or ox, and its tail like a lion or poodle. 
 Scylla – A monster from Greek mythology which has the body of a woman, six snake heads, twelve octopus tentacles, a cat's tail and four dog heads in her waist.
 Fenghuang – A Chinese creature with the head of a golden pheasant, the body of a mandarin duck, the tail of a peacock, the legs of a crane, the mouth of a parrot and the wings of a swallow.
 Kotobuki - A Japanese Chimera with the head of a rat, the ears of a rabbit, the horns of an ox, the comb of a rooster, the beard of a sheep, the neck of a Japanese dragon, the mane of a horse, the back of a wild boar, the shoulders and belly of a South China tiger, the arms of a monkey, the hindquarters of a dog, and the tail of a snake.
 Meduza – A sea creature from Russian folklore with the head of a maiden and the body of a striped beast, having a dragon tail with a snake's mouth and elephant legs with the same snake mouths.
 Navagunjara – A Hindu creature with the head of a rooster, neck of a peacock, back of a bull, a snake-headed tail, three legs of an elephant, tiger and deer or horse, fourth limb being a human hand holding a lotus.
 Pyinsarupa – A Burmese creature made of a bullock, carp, elephant, horse and the dragon.
 Tarasque – A French dragon with the head of a lion, six short legs similar to that of bear legs, the body of an ox, the shell of a turtle, and a scorpion stinger-tipped tail.
 Nawarupa – A Burmese creature with the head, trunk and tusks of an elephant, the eyes of a deer, the horns of a rhinoceros, the wings and tongue of a parrot, the body and legs of a lion and the tail of a peacock.

Modern fiction
The following hybrid creatures appear in modern fiction:

 Beast (Beauty and the Beast): The Beast, from the Disney movie Beauty and the Beast, has the head structure and horns of a bison, the arms and body of a bear, the eyebrows of a gorilla, the jaws, teeth, and mane of a lion, the tusks of a boar, and the legs and tail of a wolf.
 Cecaelia – Half-human, half-octopus. The term was coined by fans in the late 2000s to describe characters such as Ursula from The Little Mermaid.
 Brobee – A furry vegetable-like monster. He debuted in Yo Gabba Gabba!.
 Cheetaur – Half-man, half-cheetah. They are featured in the Quest for Glory video games.
 Cervitaur – A deer-type centaur. This description was also used for the Golden Hind from Hercules: The Legendary Journeys.
 Dracotaur – Half-man, half-dragon. It debuted in Dungeons & Dragons. It also has a counterpart in the form of the Dragonspawn from the Warcraft franchise. Dragoon from the Monster Rancher franchise also fits this description due to it being a fusion of a Dragon and a Centaur.
 Drider – Half-Drow half-spider. It debuted in Dungeons & Dragons.
 Gnoll – Vicious hybrid with human-like body and hyena-like head. It debuted in Dungeons & Dragons and was also featured in World of Warcraft. Inspired from but not resembling the gnoles conceived by Lord Dunsany. Considered one of the "five main "humanoid" races" in AD&D by Paul Karczag and Lawrence Schick.
 Foofa – A pink bubbly flower-like monster. She debuted in Yo Gabba Gabba!.
 Gorilla bear – A creature with the head, body, and legs of a gorilla, and the teeth and arms of a bear. It debuted in Dungeons & Dragons.
 Gwazi – A creature with the head of a tiger and the body of a lion. This is the mascot of the roller coaster Iron Gwazi located at the Busch Gardens amusement park in Tampa, Florida.
 Jackalote - A hybrid of a jackal and a coyote. They appear in The Christmas Chronicles 2 where Belsnickel created them through an unknown method so that they would pull his sleigh.
 Jaquin – A creature that resembles a jaguar with the wings and feathers of macaws. It is featured in Elena of Avalor.
 Kalidahs – Half tiger, half bear creatures first appearing in the book The Wonderful Wizard of Oz by L. Frank Baum.
 Kars- The leader of the Pillar Men and the main villain of Battle Tendency, the second part of JoJo's Bizarre Adventure. After putting on the Aja mask and transforming into the ultimate being, Kars gains bird-like wings with sharp feathers he uses as projectiles, Tentacles like an Octopus which he uses to fight, and a shell like an armadillo, which he uses to shield himself from attacks!
 Kimkoh (Contra) –  a large arthropod-like alien creature that has two large frog-like legs, its upper head possesses a snout similar to that of a tapir with fangs. the upper head's fangs and nose are directly connected to the main head, giving the impression of biting it. This main head is human, surrounded by elephant tusks. it features hermit crab-like legs sprouting out from underneath the human face and a shell of an armadillo. 
 ManBearPig – half man, half bear, half pig. Debuted in the animated television series, South Park.
 Miga - A fictional sea creature that is half-killer whale, half-Kermode bear who is one of the mascots of the 2010 Winter Olympics.
 Owlbear – A creature that is half-bear half-owl. It debuted in Dungeons & Dragons.
 Posleen – A crocodile-headed reptilian centaur from Legacy of the Aldenata.
 Rayman – Half-human, half-vegetable. He debuted in the video game series, Rayman.
 Sumi – An animal guardian spirit with the wings of a Thunderbird and the legs of an American black bear who is one of the mascot of the 2010 Winter Paralympics.
 Toodee – Part-dinosaur, part-dragon, part-rabbit. She debuted in Yo Gabba Gabba!.
 Ultimasaurus (Jurassic Park) – Its appearance gives it the head and body of a Tyrannosaurus, the frill and horns of a Triceratops, The arms, legs and feathers of a Velociraptor, the back armor and the tail club of an Ankylosaurus, and the thagomizer and dermal plates of a Stegosaurus.
 Unitaur – A unicorn-type centaur.
 Ursagryph – A creature with the head, claws, and wings of an eagle and the body of a bear. The Predacon Darksteel from Transformers Prime Beast Hunters: Predacons Rising transforms into a mechanical Ursagryph.
 Vampire-werewolf hybrid – These half-vampire half-werewolf hybrids had been shown in various media appearances like AdventureQuest (as a Werepyre), AdventureQuest Worlds (also as a Werepyre), Axe Cop (as a Wolvye), Supernatural, The Elder Scrolls, The Vampire Diaries, the Underworld franchise (as a Lycan-dominant vampire hybrids and a Lycan-Corvinus strain hybrid), and Werewolf: The Apocalypse.
 Vinicius – Part-cat, part-monkey, part-bird from Rio 2016.
 Wemic – Half-man, half-lion. It debuted in Dungeons & Dragons. It also has a counterpart in the form of the Liontaur from the Quest for Glory video games.
 Wereape - Half-man, half-ape. They have been featured in Dungeons & Dragons, Forgotten Realms and The Wereworld Series. They come in different varieties.
 Weregorilla - A gorilla-type wereape. Two appeared in The Wereworld Series and a monster mask of a weregorilla was advertised in episode 1 of Creepshow.
 Wereorangutan - An orangutan-type wereape. One appeared in The Wereworld Series.
 Wolftaur – Half-man, half-wolf. It debuted in Dungeons & Dragons. Some depictions of this creature also have wolf heads like Celious from the Monster Rancher franchise (who is depicted as a fusion of a Tiger and a Centaur) and AdventureQuest 3D (as a Lychimera).
 Zoras - Half-man half-fish. Appear in most games in The Legend of Zelda franchise.

See also

 Therianthropy
 Theriocephaly

References

Hybrids